Broad Street Methodist Episcopal Church South ("Old" Broad Street Methodist Episcopal Church South) in Columbus, Georgia is a historic church built in 1873.  It is one of the oldest buildings on Broadway (Columbus's main street) and is as the only Greek Revival church building surviving in Columbus.  It has pilasters with corbelled brick capitals.

It was added to the National Register in 1980.

It was home of the Columbus Ledger newspaper from 1915 to 1931.

It was listed on the National Register along with other historic properties identified in a large survey.

References

Methodist churches in Georgia (U.S. state)
Churches on the National Register of Historic Places in Georgia (U.S. state)
Churches completed in 1873
19th-century Methodist church buildings in the United States
Churches in Columbus, Georgia
National Register of Historic Places in Muscogee County, Georgia